Bagh-e Ebrahim (also Romanized as Bāgh-e Ebrāhīm) is a village in Sarduiyeh Rural District, Sarduiyeh District, Jiroft County, Kerman Province, Iran. At the 2006 census, its population was 110, in 15 families.

References 

Populated places in Jiroft County